Ptice is a municipality and village in Prague-West District in the Central Bohemian Region of the Czech Republic. It has about 900 inhabitants.

Twin towns – sister cities

Ptice is twinned with:
 Ledro, Italy

References

Villages in Prague-West District
Populated places in Prague-West District